KOLR (channel 10) is a television station in Springfield, Missouri, United States, affiliated with CBS. It is owned by Mission Broadcasting, which maintains a local marketing agreement (LMA) with Nexstar Media Group, owner of MyNetworkTV affiliate KOZL-TV (channel 27) and Osage Beach–licensed Fox affiliate KRBK (channel 49), for the provision of certain services. The stations share studios on East Division Street in Springfield, while KOLR's transmitter is located on Switchgrass Road, north of Fordland.

History
The station first signed on the air on March 14, 1953, as KTTS-TV; it was founded by the Independent Broadcasting Company, owners of KTTS radio (1400 AM, now KSGF on AM 1260, and 94.7 FM). Channel 10 originally operated from studio facilities located downtown, on the southwest corner of Walnut and Jefferson Streets in the Springfield Chamber of Commerce building. The station has been a CBS affiliate since its sign-on; however, it also carried a secondary affiliation with ABC, which was shared with primary NBC affiliate KYTV (channel 3) until KMTC (channel 27, now KOZL-TV) signed on in 1968.

The station changed its call letters to KOLR (for "color television") in 1971. The radio stations were sold to Wichita, Kansas–based Great Empire Broadcasting in 1972.

In 1998, Independent Broadcasting sold KOLR to Tennessee-based VHR Broadcasting, which entered into a shared services agreement with Woods Communications, owner of Fox affiliate KDEB. This combined entity was later purchased by Quorum Broadcasting. On December 31, 2003, Quorum merged with the Irving, Texas–based Nexstar Broadcasting Group; as the Springfield market did not have enough television stations to permit a legal duopoly, KOLR was sold to Brecksville, Ohio–based Mission Broadcasting.

On January 19, 2007, the station signed on its digital signal at full-power and began broadcasting network programming in high definition. KOLR has been digital-only since April 16, 2009. The station's analog transmitter operated at an effective radiated power of 316 kilowatts, the highest allowed for a VHF Band III transmitter. Some viewers had trouble picking up KOLR's signal after its switch to digital-only broadcasts, a situation not uncommon to digital broadcasters on VHF.

On June 15, 2016, Nexstar announced that it has entered into an affiliation agreement with Katz Broadcasting for the Escape, Laff, Grit, and Bounce TV networks (the last one of which is owned by Bounce Media LLC, whose COO Jonathan Katz is president/CEO of Katz Broadcasting), bringing the four networks to 81 stations owned and/or operated by Nexstar, including KOLR and KOZL-TV.

Programming
KOLR broadcasts the entire CBS network schedule. It is one of the few CBS affiliates in the Central Time Zone that airs the soap opera The Young and the Restless at 11:30 a.m.; most prefer to air it at 11:00 a.m. as a lead-in to their midday newscasts (although KOLR schedules its midday newscasts before Y&R at 11:00 a.m.). Syndicated programs broadcast by KOLR include Judge Judy, Inside Edition, and Entertainment Tonight. KOLR is one of a few CBS affiliates to air paid programming on weekdays.

News operation
KOLR presently broadcasts 23½ hours of locally produced newscasts each week (with 4½ hours each weekday and a half-hour each on Saturdays and Sundays); unlike most CBS affiliates, KOLR does not broadcast early evening newscasts on weekends. During weather segments, the station uses live NOAA National Weather Service radar data from several regional sites, which is branded on-air as "Live Digital Doppler". KOLR also operates a news bureau in downtown Branson on West Main Street, which opened in June 2013.

KOLR had the longest-running evening anchor team in the Ozarks. In March 2010, KOLR became the second television station in the Springfield market and the first Nexstar-owned duopoly (legal or virtual) to begin broadcasting its local newscasts in widescreen standard definition. In May 2011, channel 10 became the third station in the market to begin broadcasting its local newscasts in high definition; in both instances, the KSFX newscasts were included in the upgrade.

In October 2017, KOLR received new on-air graphics for its newscasts. "Overture" by Stephen Arnold Music also made a comeback, which was first used from 2003 to 2007.

On October 21, 2018, KOLR debuted its new news set. KOLR/KOZL newscasts and programming had been originating from a temporary studio set for the previous few weeks.

Notable former on-air staff
 Bob Barker (later host of The Price Is Right)
 Sean Cronin – weather anchor/reporter

Subchannels
The station's digital signal is multiplexed:

References

External links
Official website
KTTS-TV - Springfield History Museum

CBS network affiliates
Laff (TV network) affiliates
Grit (TV network) affiliates
Television channels and stations established in 1953
1953 establishments in Missouri
OLR
Nexstar Media Group